Sukhdev Patil (born 23 November  1998) is an Indian professional footballer who plays as a goalkeeper for Churchill Brothers in the I-League.

Career

Early career
Born in Kolhapur, Maharashtra, Patil started his career with Pune in their youth academy. In 2014, he was selected to be part of the Maharashtra side that took part in the 2014 Santosh Trophy. He soon joined the youth ranks at DSK Shivajians before joining Minerva Academy in 2015. On 17 February 2016, it was revealed that Patil moved once again to ONGC.

Goa and Mumbai
In August 2017, it was announced that Patil had signed with Goa of the Indian Super League as their third-choice goalkeeper. After not making an appearance with Goa, Patil signed with Mumbai in the I-League.

Delhi Dynamos
On 23 July 2017, Patil was selected in the 10th round of the 2017–18 ISL Players Draft by Delhi Dynamos for the 2017–18 Indian Super League season. He made his professional debut for the club on 6 December 2017 against Jamshedpur. He came on as an 86th minute substitute for Albino Gomes as Delhi Dynamos lost the match 1–0 through an earlier goal.

Churchill Brothers
Churchill Brothers S.C. signed the Goalkeeper on August 9, 2019

International
Patil has represented India at the under-20 level.

Career statistics

Honours 

India
 SAFF Championship runner-up: 2018

References

External links 
 Delhi Dynamos FC Profile.

1998 births
Living people
People from Kolhapur
Indian footballers
Pune FC players
DSK Shivajians FC players
RoundGlass Punjab FC players
ONGC FC players
FC Goa players
Mumbai FC players
Odisha FC players
Association football goalkeepers
Footballers from Maharashtra
Indian Super League players
India youth international footballers
Maharashtra football team players